PT Kereta Commuter Indonesia (trading as KAI Commuter, abbreviated as KCI or KAIC) is a subsidiary of the Indonesian national railway company PT Kereta Api Indonesia (KAI) which manages commuter rail services. Initially founded as an operator of Greater Jakarta commuter rail, the company currently responsible to several commuter rail and local train systems in Indonesia.

History 

KAI Commuter has its root from Jabotabek Urban Transport Division of KAI (previously PT Kereta Api), which was separated from Operating Area I Jakarta (Daerah Operasi I Jakarta) of KAI. The division handles the Jabotabek commuter rail (currently KRL Commuterline), while the Daerah Operasi I handles long-distance trains and railway infrastructures.

KAI Commuter was founded on 15 September 2008 as PT KAI Commuter Jabodetabek (KCJ, branded later as "Commuterline" or simply "Commuter"), as a spin-off from KAI. The company formation was based on Presidential Instruction (Instruksi Presiden) No. 5 of 2008 (signed by Susilo Bambang Yudhoyono) and Letter of State Minister of State-Owned Enterprises (Surat Menneg BUMN) No. S-653/MBU/2008 dated 12 August 2008; and got its operating permits from Ministry of Transportation. The main tasks of the newly formed subsidiary is to provide commuter rail transportation services using electric train in Jakarta, Bogor, Depok, Tangerang and Bekasi (Jabodetabek) and surrounding areas as well as non-passenger transportation business. Ticket revenues, rolling stock maintenance, and station management was transferred to KCJ, but all operational matters (e.g. scheduling and dispatching), rolling stock, stations and infrastructures remained under KAI's responsibility.

On 19 September 2017, PT KAI Commuter Jabodetabek changed its name into PT Kereta Commuter Indonesia (literally "Indonesia Commuter Railways"), three days after the operator's 9th anniversary. The name change reflects the wider mandate as a commuter rail operator across the country. KCI then rebranded as KAI Commuter on 28 September 2020 along with the logo change of KAI.

Starting October 2020, the operations of both Prambanan Express commuter rail dan Lokal Merak train previously managed by KAI were transferred to KAI Commuter after obtain operation permit from Ministry of Transportation on 3 June 2020. Prambanan Express is a commuter rail serving Yogyakarta and (formerly) Surakarta greater areas, which includes cities and regencies in Special Region of Yogyakarta and Central Java, while Lokal Merak is an economy-class local train operating from Rangkasbitung Station (a terminus of KRL Commuterline Green Line) to Merak Station (the westernmost station in Java which has connection to the Port of Merak) and vice versa. Prambanan Express is currently no longer serving Surakarta greater area as the electric KAI Commuter Yogyakarta Line became operational in February 2021 on the segment between Surakarta and Yogyakarta. Starting 1 April 2022, KAI Commuter will take over the Bandung Raya commuter trains, which consisted of 2 lines.

Services

COMMET

COMMET (Commuter Electronic Ticketing), largely known as KMT (Kartu Multi-Trip, "multitrip card") is the brand of contactless smart card issued by KAI Commuter. First launched on 1 July 2013, it is used primarily for multiple journey purpose in KRL Commuterline-branded services (i.e. in Greater Jakarta and Yogyakarta-Solo). The card has no expiry date. In Greater Jakarta KRL Commuterline, it can be used with a minimum credit of Rp 5,000 after KAI Commuter introduced fare adjustment machines. Passengers who don't have enough credit in their card can top-up at fare adjustment machines or two-way ticket counters.

In Greater Jakarta system, there are also single-journey cards called THB (Tiket Harian Berjaminan, "guaranteed daily ticket") running on the same system, but with expiry date of 7 days since last purchase.

In October 2021, KAI Commuter starts trial to expand the use of Multi Trip Card on other major public transportation systems in Greater Jakarta such as Transjakarta, MRT Jakarta and LRT Jakarta.

See also 

 Kereta Api Indonesia
 Rail transport in Indonesia

References

External links 
 
 Official website

Railway companies of Indonesia
Railway companies established in 2008
Indonesian companies established in 2008
Companies based in Jakarta
Regional rail in Indonesia